The Conference Board Leading Economic Index is an American economic leading indicator intended to forecast future economic activity. It is calculated by The Conference Board, a non-governmental organization, which determines the value of the index from the values of ten key variables. These variables have historically turned downward before a recession and upward before an expansion. The per cent change year over year of the Leading Economic Index is a lagging indicator of the market directions.

A Federal Reserve Bank of New York report What Predicts U.S. Recessions? uses each component of the Conference Board's Leading Economic Index. That report said that the indicators signal peaks and troughs in the business cycle, and the aggregate index has been shown to drop ahead of recessions and rise before expansions.

Revisions to The Conference Board Leading Economic Index effective with the January 26, 2012 release began using the new Leading Credit Index ... etc.

 The United States Department of Labor’s monthly report on the unemployment rate, average hourly earnings and the average workweek hours from the Employment Situation report
 The United States Department of Labor’s weekly report on first-time claims for state unemployment insurance
 The United States Census Bureau’s monthly consumer goods and materials report from the Preliminary Report on Manufacturers' Shipments, Inventories, and Orders
 The United States Census Bureau’s monthly non-defense capital goods report from the Preliminary Report on Manufacturers' Shipments, Inventories, and Orders
 The United States Census Bureau’s monthly report on building permits from the Housing Starts and Building Permits report
 The difference (spread) between the interest rates of 10-year United States Treasury notes and the federal funds rate
 The Federal Reserve's inflation-adjusted measure of the M2 money supply
 The Institute for Supply Management’s monthly ISM Index of Manufacturing including: supplier deliveries, imports, production, inventories, new orders, new export orders, order backlogs, prices and employment.
 The S&P 500
 The University of Michigan Consumer Sentiment Index's consumer expectations

See also
 Economic indicator

References

External links 
 The Conference Board's Global Business Cycle Indicators
 OECD leading indicator statistics
 Floyd Norris - New York Times Piece

Macroeconomic forecasting
Macroeconomic indicators